Scott B. Nichol (born December 31, 1974) is a Canadian former professional ice hockey player. On June 5, 2013, he announced his retirement to accept a job as the director of player development for the Nashville Predators, where he played from 2005 to 2009. In 2018, he was promoted to the general manager of the Predators' American Hockey League affiliate, the Milwaukee Admirals.

Playing career
Nichol was drafted in the 11th round, 272nd overall by the Buffalo Sabres in the 1993 NHL Entry Draft.

Nichol has represented the Buffalo Sabres, Calgary Flames, Chicago Blackhawks, Nashville Predators, and San Jose Sharks during his NHL career. During the NHL lockout season of 2004–05, Nichol played for the London Racers in the British Elite Ice Hockey League, scoring 28 points in 24 games.  In 1996 Nichol won the Calder Cup with the Rochester Americans.

On December 21, 2006, Nichol made headlines when he blindsided Buffalo Sabres defenceman Jaroslav Spacek with a punch to the head, after he thought Spacek made a dirty hit on him. The act earned Nichol a 9-game suspension.

On December 3, 2007, he was suspended for five games for cross-checking Montreal Canadiens forward Patrice Brisebois in the back of the head in a game December 1. Nichol was declared a repeat offender under the terms of the NHL Collective Bargaining Agreement.

Nichol signed a one-year deal, US$750,000 deal with the San Jose Sharks on July 15, 2009.

On March 4, 2010, Nichol was injured when Montreal Canadiens forward Maxim Lapierre hit him on a late and dangerous hit, leaving him with an upper body injury for seven days.

On June 20, 2011, Sharks General Manager Doug Wilson announced that Nichol, and teammate Jamal Mayers, would not be resigned for the 2011–12 season. On July 5, 2011, Nichol was signed to a one-year contract with the St. Louis Blues.

Nichol announced his retirement following the lockout shortened 2012–13 season on June 5, 2013. He was appointed the head of player development with former club, the Nashville Predators, a position that had been filled by former Predator and ex-teammate Martin Gelinas. In 2018, he was named the general manager of the Predators' affiliate in the American Hockey League, the Milwaukee Admirals.

Career statistics

References

External links

1974 births
Living people
Buffalo Sabres draft picks
Buffalo Sabres players
Calgary Flames players
Canadian ice hockey centres
Chicago Blackhawks players
Detroit Vipers players
London Racers players
Milwaukee Admirals players
Nashville Predators executives
Nashville Predators players
Portland Winterhawks players
Rochester Americans players
St. Louis Blues players
San Jose Sharks players
Ice hockey people from Edmonton
Canadian expatriate ice hockey players in England